Big Day in a Small Town is the second studio album by American country music artist Brandy Clark. It was released on June 10, 2016, through Warner Bros. Records. The album was nominated for Best Country Album and the album's second single, "Love Can Go To Hell", was nominated for Best Country Solo Performance at the 59th Annual Grammy Awards.

Background
Two of the album's tracks were previously recorded by other artists: "Homecoming Queen" previously appeared on Feels Like Home, the 2013 studio album by Sheryl Crow, and "Three Kids No Husband" previously appeared on the 2014 album Numbered Doors, by its co-writer Lori McKenna.

The track "Daughter" features Clark's close friend and collaborator Kacey Musgraves on harmony vocals.

Critical reception

Big Day in a Small Town received highly positive reviews from music critics. At Metacritic, which assigns a normalized rating out of 100 to reviews from mainstream critics, the album has an average score of 84 out of 100, which indicates "universal acclaim" based on 5 reviews. Stephen Thomas Erlewine of AllMusic states: "Songs rarely come much better than these." Rolling Stones Will Hermes calls it "music tooled alternately for stadiums and songwriting circles, commercial and public radio, line-dance bars and coffee shops." Additionally, it was the Spin "album of the week" and called "fantastic; often a superb piece of recorded music" by reviewer Alfred Soto. The Boston Globes Stuart Munro wrote: "If you're looking for alternatives to mainstream country, Clark is still providing one... you just have to keep listening beyond the first two tracks to find it."

Track listing
Writing credits source: BMI

Personnel
Credits adapted from AllMusic.Musicians Brandy Clark – acoustic guitar, lead vocals, background vocals
 John Deaderick – keyboards
 Fred Eltringham – drums
 Keith Gattis – guitar
 Jason Hall – background vocals 
 Jay Joyce – banjo, guitar, organ, background vocals 
 Shane McAnally – background vocals 
 Pat McGrath – resonator guitar
 Rob McNelley – guitar
 Kacey Musgraves – background vocals 
 Josh Osborne – background vocals 
 Dave Roe – bass guitar
Morgane Stapleton – background vocals 
Forest Glen Whitehead – guitar, background vocalsTechnical personnel'''
 Paul Cossette – assistant engineer
 Jason Hall – engineer, mixing
 Chris Johnson – photography
 Jay Joyce – engineer, mixing, producer
 Pamela Littky – portrait photography
 Dan McCarroll – A&R
 Melissa Spillman – production assistant
 Caleb VanBuskirk – assistant engineer
 Stephen Walker – art direction, design, illustrations
 Cate Wright – A&R

Commercial performanceBig Day in a Small Town'' debuted at number eighty-two on the US Billboard 200 chart with 8,100 equivalent album units; it sold 7,400 copies in its first week, with the remainder of its unit total reflecting the album's streaming activity and track sales. As of August 2016 the album has sold 15,500 copies in the US.

Chart performance

Release history

References

2016 albums
Brandy Clark albums
Warner Records albums
Albums produced by Jay Joyce